The Men's Boxing Tournament at the 1999 Pan American Games was held in Winnipeg, Manitoba, Canada from July 31 to August 8. It served as a qualification tournament for the 2000 Summer Olympics in Sydney, Australia. The number one and two earned a ticket for the Olympic Tournament.

Medal winners

Medal table

External links
Amateur Boxing

P
Boxing at the Pan American Games
Events at the 1999 Pan American Games
International boxing competitions hosted by Canada